Constitutional French Monarchy may refer to:

Kingdom of the French (1791–1792), the constitutional reign of Louis XVI
First French Empire (1804–1814, 1815)
Bourbon Restoration (1814, 1815–1830)
Kingdom of the French (1830–1848) 
Second French Empire (1852–1870)